Chestnut Street Log House is a historic home located in Lebanon, Lebanon County, Pennsylvania. It was built around 1772, and is a -story, rectangular log residence on a limestone foundation.  It is three bays wide and one bay deep, with a gable roof, and central fireplace.  It is believed to have been raised 1 1/2-feet about 1850, and according to National Register of Historic Places records was restored to its 1700s appearance around 1978.

It was added to the National Register of Historic Places in 1978.

References

Houses on the National Register of Historic Places in Pennsylvania
Houses completed in 1772
Houses in Lebanon County, Pennsylvania
National Register of Historic Places in Lebanon County, Pennsylvania